Lee James Schraner (born 1982) is a male lawn bowls World Singles Champion of Champions Gold and dual Bronze medalist. He became the number one ranked bowler in Australia in October 2018 and held the ranking until June 2019.

Bowls career summary
Schraner began bowls in 1994 at Mount Cottrell Bowling Club, located on the outskirts of Melton, Victoria. He won the 2019 World Singles Champion of Champions, beating Tony Cheung in the final.

He has played 314 Interstate Test Matches; 12 for New South Wales from 2022-current; 211 for Victoria from 2004-2013 and 2020, and 91 test matches for Tasmania 2014–2019.

Australian representation 
Schraner represented Australia at Under 25 level and Open Men's Level on numerous occasions, but yielded only one official cap for his Country. He became the 132nd male to represent Australia in Lawn Bowls when he led in the pairs for Mark Jacobsen against England, in the "Battle on the Border" at Moama Bowling Club in February 2010.

Schraner was omitted from the Australian Squad that same year, prior to the Delhi Commonwealth Games. In July 2018 he was named in the Australian Jackaroos Emerging Squad (the tier below the Open squad), but after just one year, he was omitted in June 2019. At age 37, he retired indefinitely from official National duties.

International Record 
Schraner has represented Australia at Under 25 level and Open level on 52 occasions, but only one of those matches was an officially capped match. His single capped match was his 13th International appearance. Of the 52 matches, 42 were in Singles, 6 were in Triples, 3 were in Fours and 1 was in Pairs. 

39 of Schraner's matches were in the 2018, 2019 & 2022 World Champion of Champions Singles (WCOC), where he qualified by winning back-to-back 2017 & 2018 Australian Champion of Champions Singles, and then again in 2021. Schraner lost just 7 of his 52 matches in Australian colours and just 3 of his 42 Singles matches, highlighting a 93% win record as an International Singles player. His 2022 WCOC bronze medal was his third all-time medal.

Championships - National and State 
Schraner is an 8 time National Champion, 9 time National Grand Prix Champion and 21 time State Champion. 

Schraner is the only player in history, male or female, to have won the Australian Champion of Champions Singles Gold Medal three times. These victories came in 2017 in Darwin, 2018 in Hobart and 2022 (for the 2021 event) on the Gold Coast. He won the Australian Open Pairs in 2011, the Australian Fours Gold Medal in 2019 and the Australian Pairs Gold Medal in 2020. His other two National titles came in the 2017 Australian Master's Games, where he won gold in the pairs and triples. 

At State level, Schraner has won the Champion of Champions Singles seven times, the Open Singles three times, the Open Pairs three times, the Open Triples twice and the Open Fours twice. He was also a three time winner of the Under 30 Singles in Victoria in 2001, 2003 and 2005, as well as a State School's Champion in 1997.

Outside sports 
Schraner completed Secondary School at Kurunjang Secondary College in Melton, Victoria in 1999. He later attended Deakin University where he completed a Bachelor of Commerce (2000–2002) with majors in Commercial Law, Accounting, Finance & Financial Planning. Schraner is now a GST Specialist and licensed BAS Agent, running his own business from home called LJ Schraner Group, a bookkeeping service specialising in GST and BAS services.

Published Author 
Schraner has been a published author four times:

Personal life 
Schraner was diagnosed with General Anxiety Disorder (GAD), Clinical Depression, and Psychomotor Retardation, after suffering a nervous breakdown in 2003. He publicly shares his battles with mental health on his personal facebook page, attempting to breakdown the stigma of Men's Mental Health. 

In 2017, Schraner contracted Indian Swine flu while living in Tasmania, an illness that left him close to death. His illness led to a second nervous breakdown. It took him almost 3 months to recover, during which he lost almost 50% of his body weight. Through that period, he used the services of Lifeline Australia to combat his mental illness and suicidal thoughts.

Schraner is also an openly gay athlete, known for his support of the movement to legalise Gay Marriage in Australia.

References

Australian male bowls players
Living people
1982 births
Sportsmen from Victoria (Australia)
Australian LGBT sportspeople
Gay sportsmen
People from the City of Melton
Sportspeople from Melbourne
Deakin University alumni